The China Railway Engineering Corporation (CRECG) is a state-owned holding company of China, which is under the supervision of the State Council. The company is the major shareholder of China Railway Group Limited (CREC), its subsidiary.

History
The history of the company could be traced back to 1950 which two bureaus of the Ministry of Railways were formed ( and ). In 1958, the design bureau and the construction bureau were merged to form the General Bureau of Capital Construction of the Ministry of Railways. From 1950 to 1990, the General Bureau was a government agency for many railway construction as well as highway bridge. A subsidiary of the General Bureau, The Major Bridge Engineering Bureau, now  was said to construct over 1,000 bridges from 1953 to 2009.

In 1989, the Ministry of Railways decided to form China Railway Engineering Corporation (CRECG) as well as fellow competitor China Railway Construction Corporation (CRCCG) as subsidiaries. CRECG was formally registered on 7 March 1990. In 2000, they were transferred from the ministry to "Central Large Enterprise Work Commission" of the Communist Party of China. In 2003, they were under supervision of State-owned Assets Supervision and Administration Commission (SASAC), a commission of the State Council. Since then, they became competitors despite both being state-owned.

In 2007, a limited company was incorporated (China Railway Group Limited), CRECG transferred most of their assets to the subsidiary. In 2008, the subsidiary became a publicly traded company which floats in Shanghai and Hong Kong Stock Exchange.

Projects
 Cambodia CRECG with Ministry of Public Works and Transport constructed the Siem Reap - Phnom Penh - Doun Kaev - Kampot High Speed Railway.
 Jordan China Railway Engineering Corporation with Ministry of Transport of Jordan constructed the Amman Metro.

References

External links
   (currently redirect to the official website of China Railway Group Limited, the subsidiary)
 

Government-owned companies of China
Chinese companies established in 1958
Holding companies established in 2007
Chinese companies established in 2007
Chinese companies established in 1990